Thomas Trenchard (1640 – 20 November 1671) was an English politician who served as Member of Parliament for Poole in Dorset from 1670 to 1671.

Family 

His younger brothers were fellow MPs John Trenchard and Henry Trenchard.

Life 
He was elected to Parliament in the 1690 general election.

Death 
He died on 20 November 1671, and was buried at Charminster.

References 

1640 births
1671 deaths
English MPs 1661–1679
People from Poole
People from Purbeck District